MS Augustus was a combined ocean liner and cruise ship built in 1927 for Navigazione Generale Italiana. The ship was later transferred to the new Italian Line after the merger of Navigazione Generale Italiana. During World War 2 the Roma was converted into an aircraft carrier and renamed as Falco. In 1944, both ships were taken over by the German troops but, on 25 September of that year she was scuttled. After the war she was raised and scrapped in 1946. sister ship was SS Roma.

History

Ocean Liner Career
Following the end of World War I, many shipping companies were planning to build new liners once they had enough money. Navigazione Generale Italiana decided to build two new liners of over 30,000 gross registered tons for post war service. The first ship was Roma which was launched in 1926. The second ship was launched in December 1926 at the Ansaldo Shipyard and was christened Augustus by Edda Mussolini (daughter of dictator Benito Mussolini). She was fitted out and made her maiden voyage on 10 November 1927. Her interior was decorated in the Baroque style. She was the largest diesel-engined passenger ship of her time, whereas her sister was equipped with geared steam turbines. The Augustus was c. 215 meters long and was designed to carry 1,675 passengers.

She operated on the South American service while her sister ran the North Atlantic service. The Augustus could reportedly reach South America from Italy in five days at an average speed of 22 knots. In 1932, Navigazione Generale Italiana was forced by Mussolini  to merge with other Italian shipping companies to form the Italia Line. Because of this, the funnels of the Augustus were repainted in Italia Line colours. In 1933, she began to carry out 129-day world cruises after the Wall Street Crash of 1929. She carried many passengers from New York to a number of ports around the world and back to New York in 129 days. The Roma will continue passenger service until 1939.

Conversion to aircraft carrier

At the outbreak of World War II the Augustus and the Roma were laid up but both ships were subsequently taken over by the Italian Navy. Like her sister, the Augustus was converted into an aircraft carrier and renamed Falco and later Sparviero. In 1944, both ships were taken over by the German troops but on 25 September of that year she was scuttled, in order to blockade Genoa harbour from the Allies. After the war she was raised and scrapped in 1946.

References
Page at List of Italian Steamships 

Passenger ships of Italy
Ocean liners
Cruise ships
1926 ships
Ships built in Genoa
Ships built by Gio. Ansaldo & C.
Cultural depictions of Augustus